Pádraig Timoney (born 1968 in Derry, Northern Ireland) is an artist who has become noted for the extreme diversity of his work so that his solo exhibitions sometimes appear to be group exhibitions by different artists. Timoney graduated from Goldsmiths College, University of London, in 1991 and in 1999 was one of the curators for the Liverpool Biennial. Timoney works principally using photography, painting and installation.

Selected publications
Beled Answer, Decathlon Books, New York, 2011.

Selected works
Untitled, 2010, with "Dragon's blood".
Consider the Lillies of the Field, 2009.
Che Meraviglia, 1997.

Selected solo exhibitions
2013, 'Fontwell Helix Feely', Raven Row, London.
2012, 'Stanligrad in every city', Raucci/Santamaria, Naples.
2012, 'Shepard Tone', The Modern Institute, Osborne Street, Glasgow.
2010, 'Instead of Being Lucky', Andrew Kreps Gallery, New York.

2010, 'Buenas Noches, Laser', Xavier Hufkens, Brussels.
2009, 'Folklores', Raucci/Santamaria, Naples.
2008, 'Rockeryeer', The Modern Institute/Toby Webster Ltd, Glasgow.
2008, 'Fave New Bridges Knot Knowing Corona Cardinals', Galerie Almine Rech, Paris.
2007, Xavier Hufkens, Brussels.
2007, 'Golarithm', Andrew Kreps Gallery, New York.
2006, 'Museum Metropolitan', Galleria Raucci/Santamaria, Naples.
2006, 'The Fear of All Sums - Ten Million Dice To Weigh', Void, Derry (Curated by C. Darke).
2005, 'One year speaks clear some years’ peaks clear', Raucci/Santamaria, Naples.
2003, 'The Modern Institute/Toby Webster Ltd, Glasgow.

2003, Castlefield Gallery, Manchester.
2003, 'Statement Art Basel', Art Basel, Basel (With Raucci/Santamaria Gallery).
2003, 'The Grapevine in the Limelight', 38 Langham Street, London.
2002, 'Lazy Clever Doubt', Douglas Hyde Gallery, Dublin.
2002, 'Millions of Dead Tamagotchi', Bluecoat Gallery, Liverpool.
2002, 'Present Future', Raucci/Santamaria Gallery, Turin (Artissima).
2000, 'The Suburban', Oak Park, Chicago.
1997, Raucci/Santamaria, Naples.
1997, 'No Tim Page Diary', Galerie Analix, Geneva.
1997, 'The Hunter Became … The Hunted', Laure Genillard, London.
1996, 'Works Away', Orchard Gallery, Derry.
1995, Cyprus Photographic Society, Nicosia, Cyprus.
1994, Raucci/Santamaria, Naples.
1993, 'September', Laure Genillard, London.
1992, Goldsmiths Gallery, London.
1992, Milch, London.

External links
 http://raucciesantamaria.eu/project/padraig-timoney/
 http://www.andrewkreps.com/artists/padraig-timoney
 https://www.themoderninstitute.com/artists/pdraig-timoney/
 at Xavier Hufkens

References

Living people
1968 births
Artists from Northern Ireland
Alumni of Goldsmiths, University of London